The Lancer 44 is an American sailboat that was designed by Herb David as a motorsailer and first built in 1979.

Production
The design was built by Lancer Yachts in the United States, between 1979 and 1982, but it is now out of production.

Design
The Lancer 44 is a recreational keelboat, built predominantly of fiberglass. It has a masthead sloop rig, a raked stem, an angled transom with a swimming platform, a skeg-mounted rudder controlled by a wheel and a fixed fin keel. It displaces  and carries  of lead ballast.

The boat is fitted with an inboard engine for cruising, docking and maneuvering.

The design has sleeping accommodation for four people, with a double berth in the bow cabin and double berth in a second cabin forward on the port side. The galley is located on the port side, amidships. A large salon is located aft. The head is located just aft of the bow cabin on the starboard side and includes a shower.

See also
List of sailing boat types

References

External links
Photo of a Lancer 44 launching
Photo of a Lancer 44 sailing

Keelboats
1970s sailboat type designs
Sailing yachts
Motorsailers
Sailboat type designs by Herb David
Sailboat types built by Lancer Yachts